Ivanovci Đakovački is a village in Croatia. It is administratively located in the Town of Đakovo. According to the 2011 census, the village has a population of 508.

Before 2011, the village was called Ivanovci Gorjanski.

References 

Populated places in Osijek-Baranja County